Alabama has a per capita income of $28,934 (2020). Its median household income is $52,035 (2020), with 16.1% of Alabama residents living in poverty.

Alabama counties ranked by per capita income

Data is from the 2020 United States census.

References

Locations by per capita income
United States locations by per capita income
Income
Income